Elmer Figueroa Arce (born June 28, 1968), better known under the stage name Chayanne, is a Puerto Rican Latin pop singer and actor. As a solo artist, Chayanne has released 21 albums and sold over 50 million records worldwide, making him one of the best-selling Latin music artists.

Chayanne participated in two Puerto Rican telenovelas broadcast by WAPA-TV television station in the 80s. These were Sombras del Pasado with Daniel Lugo and Alba Nydia Díaz, and Tormento with Daniel Lugo and Yazmin Pereira.

Biography

Early life
Figueroa Arce's father is Quintino Figueroa, a sales manager, and his mother was Irma Luz Arce, a teacher, who died on April 17, 2014, after a long fight against cancer. He is the third of five siblings. His nickname "Chayanne" was given to him by his mother, in honor of his love for the 1950s American television series, Cheyenne.

Career with Los Chicos

In the late 1970s, he auditioned for Menudo, but the producers told him that he was too young to be in the group. He joined another group, Los Chicos, and they produced several hit recordings, including "Puerto Rico Son Los Chicos" and "Ave Maria".

Solo artist

After Los Chicos separated in 1984, Chayanne began his career as a solo artist. He signed with RCA Víctor and released his debut album, Chayanne es mi Nombre, that year. His second album with RCA Víctor, Sangre Latina was released in 1986.

After three years with RCA Víctor, Chayanne switched labels to Sony Music and broke out with his first self-titled album in 1987. This album featured a blend of ballads and dance tracks, a formula for which Chayanne would be famous. It featured two hit songs, the ballad "Peligro de Amor" written by Michael Sullivan and Paulo Massadas and a song that would cement him as an overall performer, the upbeat dance track "Fiesta en América" written by Honorio Herrero.

On November 1, 1988, Chayanne released his second self-titled album, Chayanne. This album featured several hit singles, including Honorio Herrero's "Tu Pirata Soy Yo", José María Cano's "Fuiste un Trozo de Hielo en la Escarcha", and "Este Ritmo Se Baila Así", composed by Pierre-Edouard Decimus, Jacob Desvarieux, both members of French Caribbean band Kassav', and Roberto Livi. At the same time, Chayanne became a spokesperson for Pepsi, with the airing of the first Spanish-speaking advertising spot broadcast on national television coast to coast during the 1989 Grammy Awards telecast.

On August 7, 1990, he released the album Tiempo de Vals, featuring some of his best-selling singles; such as the title track, composed by José María Cano; "Completamente Enamorados", composed by Piero Cassano, Adelio Cogliati, and Eros Ramazzotti; and "Daría Cualquier Cosa", composed by Luis Gómez Escolar and Julio Seijas. He followed it with the album whose title track would eventually become Chayanne's signature song, Provócame (1992). That album also featured the hit "El Centro de mi Corazón" (#1 U.S. Hot Latin, 1992), and was nominated for Pop Song of the Year at the Lo Nuestro Awards of 1993, while Chayanne was listed for Male Pop Artist. Two years later, he released the album Influencias (1994), which was a tribute to some of his musical influences. In 1996, he released Volver a Nacer.

In 1998, he received his second Grammy nomination with the album Atado a Tu Amor, which featured his first number-one hit since 1992, "Dejaria Todo" as well as a long-lasting hit in the title track. The hot streak continued in 2000 when Chayanne released Simplemente with the top-ten hit "Candela" and the number-one hit "Yo Te Amo". On March 19, 2002, he released Grandes Exitos, a greatest hits album with a few new tracks. One of those new tracks, "Y Tu Te Vas", was the number-one song of the summer in 2002, and went on to be the theme song for a Venezuelan telenovela Todo sobre Camila which was produced by Venevisión. The next year, Chayanne released Sincero which featured two number-one songs, "Un Siglo Sin Ti" and "Cuidarte el Alma".

In 2005, he did a tour alongside Alejandro Fernández and Marc Anthony. That same year, he released two albums. First, a second greatest hits album, Desde Siempre with the new song "Contra Vientos y Mareas", followed by Cautivo with hits such as "No Se Por Que", "Te Echo de Menos" and "No Te Preocupes Por Mí".

Chayanne's 13th album Mi Tiempo was released on April 10, 2007. The album debuted at number two on the Top Latin Album chart selling 17,000 copies in its first week of release. The first single off the album, "Si Nos Quedara Poco Tiempo", reached number one on the Hot Latin Tracks chart.

Following the album's release, Chayanne began an international tour to promote Mi Tiempo. Among the places visited early in the tour were Mexico, Venezuela, Ecuador, Peru, and the United States.

On August 24, 2008, he began a series of presentations in Spain. When interviewed he noted that the concert would be fluid "like a musical", and "more Latin" than his previous presentations, being composed of "more pop, Brazilian, Caribbean and reggae rhythms" which he would use to "dance constantly".

He gave a special performance at the Miss Universe 2003 pageant. On October 12, 2009, Chayanne released a new single titled "Me Enamoré de Ti", serving as the theme song for the 2009 soap opera Corazon Salvaje. This single is featured in Chayanne's 2010 release, No Hay Imposibles.

On March 14, 2015, Chayanne released a new single titled, "Tu respiración", serving as the theme song for the 2015 soap opera Lo imperdonable.

Acting career

In the 1980s, Chayanne participated in several soap operas and starred in the comedy series Generaciones with Luis Antonio Rivera. In 1994 he played himself in Volver a empezar along with Yuri. That same year, he also starred in Linda Sara opposite former Miss Universe, Dayanara Torres. The film was written and directed by famous Puerto Rican filmmaker Jacobo Morales. In 1998, he starred in his first Hollywood role, playing a Cuban dancer along with Vanessa L. Williams in Dance with Me. He also made a guest appearance on Ally McBeal. In the next few years he worked in other projects like the Argentine soap opera Provócame, for which he made the soundtrack of the same name.

In 2008, Chayanne played the title role (of a vampire) on the television series Gabriel: Amor Inmortal. To familiarize himself with the concept he adopted a different daily schedule, sleeping during the day and working at night. He noted that the production wanted to "make things look as real as possible", but that the adaptation process was difficult. The series debuted on September 28, 2008, on Mega TV.

Filmography

Films

Television

Songs for television and movies

Discography

1984: Es mi nombre
1986: Sangre Latina
1987: Chayanne
1988: Chayanne II
1990: Tiempo de Vals
1992: Provócame
1994: Influencias
1996: Volver a Nacer
1998: Atado a Tu Amor
2000: Simplemente
2002: Grandes éxitos
2003: Sincero
2005: Desde Siempre
2005: Cautivo
2007: Mi tiempo
2008: Vivo
2010: No hay imposibles
2012: A Solas Con Chayanne
2014: En Todo Estaré
2015: Personalidad

See also
List of Puerto Ricans

References

External links

1968 births
American male pop singers
Living people
Latin pop singers
Male actors from Miami
Male actors from San Juan, Puerto Rico
Musicians from Miami
People from San Lorenzo, Puerto Rico
Puerto Rican male film actors
20th-century Puerto Rican male singers
Puerto Rican male television actors
Puerto Rican pop singers
Sony Music Latin artists
Singers from San Juan, Puerto Rico